This is a list of Members of Parliament (MPs) elected to the House of Commons at the 1997 general election, held on 1 May.

The list is arranged by constituency. New MPs elected since the general election are noted at the bottom of the page.

During the 1997–2001 Parliament, Betty Boothroyd and Michael Martin served as Speaker, Tony Blair served as Prime Minister, and John Major and William Hague served as Leader of the Opposition. Dissolution of Parliament was on 14 May 2001.

Sub-lists 

 List of MPs for constituencies in Scotland (1997–2001)
 List of MPs for constituencies in Wales (1997–2001)

Composition
These representative diagrams show the composition of the parties in the 1997 general election.

Note: The Scottish National Party and Plaid Cymru sit together as a party group, while Sinn Féin has not taken its seats. This is not the official seating plan of the House of Commons, which has five rows of benches on each side, with the government party to the right of the Speaker and opposition parties to the left, but with room for only around two-thirds of MPs to sit at any one time.

The effective majority is slightly higher as Sinn Féin members choose not to take up their seats, and the speaker doesn't usually vote. Speaker Betty Boothroyd was included in a Labour notional majority for statistical purposes.

Note:

 The election of Mark Oaten was declared void by the election court on 6 October 1997.

By-elections 
See the list of United Kingdom by-elections.

References

1997
1997 United Kingdom general election
 Main
UK MPs
Lists of UK MPs 1997–2001